Menelaus (Menelaos), son of Lagus and brother of Ptolemy I Soter (ruler of Egypt), served as priest of the eponymous state cult of Alexander, and was for a time king in Cyprus, under his brother.

His name does not occur among the officers or generals of Alexander the Great (336–323 BC) during the lifetime of that monarch, though it is incidentally mentioned by Phylarchus in terms that would seem to imply that he then already occupied a distinguished position. The first occasion on which he appears in history is 315 BC, when he was appointed by his brother to the chief command of the forces dispatched to Cyprus, where they were destined to co-operate with the fleet of Seleucus, and with Nicocreon, king of Salamis. By their combined efforts, they soon reduced all the cities of Cyprus to subjection, with the exception of Citium; and that also, it would appear, must have ultimately submitted. Menelaus now remained in the island, which he governed with almost absolute authority, the petty princes of the several cities being deposed, imprisoned, or assassinated on the slightest symptom of disaffection. 

He still held the chief command in 306 BC, when Demetrius Poliorcetes arrived in Cyprus with a powerful fleet and army. Unable to contend with this formidable antagonist in the open field, Menelaus drew together all his forces, and shut himself up within the walls of Salamis, which he prepared to defend to the utmost. But having risked an action under the walls of the town, he was defeated with much loss; and Demetrius pressed the siege with his wonted vigour. Menelaus, however, succeeded in burning his battering engines, and by the most strenuous exertions, made good his defence until the arrival of Ptolemy himself, with a powerful fleet, to the relief of the island. In the great sea-fight that ensued, Menelaus sent a squadron of sixty ships to assist Ptolemy; but though these succeeded in forcing their way out of the harbour of Salamis, they came too late to retrieve the fortune of the day; and the total defeat of the Egyptian fleet having extinguished all his hopes of succour, he immediately afterwards surrendered the city of Salamis, with all his forces, both military and naval, into the hands of Demetrius. The conqueror, with characteristic magnanimity, sent him back to Egypt, accompanied by his friends, and carrying with him all his private property.

In the 280s, he served as the first eponymous priest of the cult of Alexander.

Notes

References
 Smith, William (editor); Dictionary of Greek and Roman Biography and Mythology, "Menelaus (3)", Boston, (1867)
 E. R. Bevan ''House of Ptolemy, Chapter II
 

Ancient Macedonian priests
Ancient Macedonian generals
Ptolemaic dynasty
4th-century BC rulers
Ancient Eordaeans
4th-century BC Greek people
4th-century BC Macedonians
Ptolemaic governors of Cyprus
Ancient Greek priests